USCGC Aspen (WLB-208) is the eighth cutter in the Juniper-class  of seagoing buoy tenders. She is under the operational control of the Commander of the Eleventh U.S. Coast Guard District and is home-ported at Yerba Buena Island in San Francisco, California. Her primary area of responsibility is the coastal waters, river bars and high seas from the California–Oregon border to San Diego, California. Aspen conducts heavy lift aids-to-navigation operations, and law enforcement, homeland security, environmental pollution response, and search and rescue as directed.

Construction and characteristics
USCGC Aspen was built by the Marinette Marine Corporation in Wisconsin and launched on 21 April 2001. Aspen is propelled by two Caterpillar diesel engines rated at 3,100 horsepower, and has a top speed of 16 knots. She has a single controllable-pitch propeller, which along with bow and stern thrusters allow the ship to be maneuvered to set buoys close offshore and in restricted waters. A dynamic global positioning system coupled with machinery plant controls and a chart display and information system allow station-keeping of the ship within a five-meter accuracy of the planned position without human intervention. Aspen is also equipped with an oil-skimming system known as the Spilled Oil Recovery System (SORS) which is used in her mission of maritime environmental protection. The cutter has a 2,875 square foot buoy deck area with a crane used for servicing large ocean buoys.

Mission
USCGC Aspen is a seagoing buoy tender with her primary mission being the servicing of aids-to navigation buoys in her area of responsibility (AOR). She services over 100 navigation buoys in her AOR as well as several National Oceanic and Atmospheric Administration (NOAA) data collection buoys. Aspens other missions include maritime law enforcement, homeland security, ensuring the security of ports and waterways, maritime environmental response, as well as search and rescue duties.

History
Aspen was built to replace , a  Mesquite-class buoy tender, in her area of operations. Buttonwood was decommissioned 28 June 2001 after 58 years of service. In 2009, Aspen seized  of marijuana and arrested four suspected smugglers from a go-fast boat off the coast of Baja California, which as at the time the third largest marijuana seizure in Coast Guard history and the first by a Juniper-class cutter. Aspen was deployed to the Gulf of Mexico in 2010 in response to the Deepwater Horizon oil spill. She recovered over 35 bales of marijuana of the coast of Baja California and returned thirteen illegal immigrants to Mexico in 2011. In July 2012, she seized 341 bales of marijuana weighing  with a street value in excess of  6.7 million. In 2012, USCGC Aspen recovered two (NOAA) specialized ocean wave glider buoys worth  750,000 and serviced 7 other NOAA buoys. She also serviced 44 navigational buoys and helped Coast Guard Station Golden Gate with 25 hours of small boat response time.

The original Aspen
The original Aspen was a  buoy tender that was built by Craig Shipbuilding of Toledo, Ohio and commissioned by the U.S. Lighthouse Service on 8 May 1906. She serviced aids-to-navigation on the Great Lakes and brought supplies lighthouse keepers located in remote areas. When the tender was transferred to the Coast Guard in 1942 it was home-ported in Sault Ste. Marie, Michigan and designated WAGL-204. She carried a crew of 2 officers and 23 men in 1942 and was decommissioned by the Coast Guard on 25 January 1947.

Citations

References

Further reading
 

2001 ships
Juniper-class seagoing buoy tenders
Ships of the United States Coast Guard
Ships built by Marinette Marine